Toten Island (Swahili Kisiwa cha Toten, adapted from German Toteninsel, meaning "Island of the Dead") is a small uninhabited and protected island situated north of the city of  Tanga's harbour in Tanga Region, Tanzania. It is within the Tanga Bay. The island is administered by both the Tanzania Marine Parks and Reserves (Which is under the Misnistry of Natural Resources and Tourism) and the City of Tanga.  The island is a historical site that contains ruins of two Medieval Swahili mosques and tombs. The current name comes from the German word for "dead bodies" alluding to the numerous graves on the island.
Until 1854 Toten Island was still inhabited by people. In 1884 the remaining people moved to what is present day Tanga city.

See also
Historic Swahili Settlements
National Historic Sites in Tanzania
Swahili architecture

References

Swahili people
Swahili city-states
Swahili culture
Uninhabited islands of Tanzania
Tanga, Tanzania
Geography of Tanga Region
National Historic Sites in Tanga Region
National Historic Sites in Tanzania
Islands of Tanga Region
Archaeological sites in Tanzania